Villacián is a surname. Notable people with the surname include:

Miriam Villacián (born 1950), Cuban gymnast
Roberto Villacián (1928–2003), Cuban gymnast